Safety is the first extended play and public release by British rock band Coldplay. It was recorded at Tottenham's Sync City Studios with Nikki Rosetti between 1 and 2 February 1998, following their debut live performance at The Laurel Tree. Phil Harvey financed the sessions for £1500 and received a box with 500 copies on 19 May 1998. Most of them were given away to record labels, friends and family, but around 150 are known have been on open market.

According to Harvey, his father and an Oxford roommate were the ones to help him fund Safety. The latter originally bought a copy of it for around £3. On 25 May 1998, the band managed to sell 50 units of the extended play to their public at Dingwalls. All songs appeared unaltered on subsequent Coldplay releases: "Bigger Stronger" and "Such a Rush" were featured on The Blue Room, while "No More Keeping My Feet on the Ground" was used as a B-side for their breakthrough hit "Yellow".

Packaging
The album artwork is a photograph of lead singer Chris Martin taken by John Hilton, a friend of the band. His long exposure shot captured Martin's moving head perfectly framed by a safety door sign at one of the band's gigs and inspired the EP's title.

Track listing
All songs written by Guy Berryman, Jonny Buckland, Will Champion and Chris Martin.

Personnel 
Coldplay
 Guy Berryman – bass guitar
 Jonny Buckland – electric guitar
 Will Champion – drums
 Chris Martin – vocals, keyboards, acoustic guitar

Technical personnel
 Nikki Rosetti – production, engineering

References

External links
 Coldplay Official Website
 

Coldplay EPs
1998 debut EPs
Self-released EPs